David Stevenson MICE FRSE FRSSA (11 January 1815 – 17 July 1886) was a Scottish lighthouse designer, who designed over 30 lighthouses in and around Scotland, and helped continue the dynasty of lighthouse engineering founded by his father.

Life

He was born on 11 January 1815 at 2 Baxters Place at the top of Leith Walk in Edinburgh, the son of Jean Smith and engineer Robert Stevenson. He was brother of the lighthouse engineers Alan and Thomas Stevenson. He was educated at the High School in Edinburgh then studied at the University of Edinburgh. In 1838 he became a partner in his father's (and uncle's) firm of R & A Stevenson.

In 1844 he was elected a Fellow of the Royal Society of Edinburgh his proposer being David Milne-Home.

In 1853 he moved to the Northern Lighthouse Board.

Between 1854 and 1880 he designed many lighthouses, all with his brother Thomas. In addition he helped Richard Henry Brunton design lighthouses for Japan, inventing a novel method for allowing them to withstand earthquakes. His sons David Alan Stevenson and Charles Alexander Stevenson continued his work after his death, building nearly thirty further lighthouses.

In the 1860s he lived at 25 Royal Terrace, Edinburgh.

Non-lighthouse engineering included the Edinburgh and Leith Sewerage Scheme and the widening of North Bridge in Edinburgh.

In 1868 and 1869 he served as president of the Royal Scottish Society of the Arts.

He died in North Berwick on 17 July 1886. He is buried in Dean Cemetery in west Edinburgh. The grave lies on the north wall of the original cemetery backing onto the first northern extension.

Publications
Sketch of the Civil Engineering of North america (1838)
Canal and River Engineering (c.1870)
The Life of Robert Stevenson (1878)

Family
In 1840 he married Elizabeth Mackay (1816-1871). Their children included Charles Alexander Stevenson and David Alan Stevenson. His daughter Jane Stevenson (d.1909) married William Mackintosh, Lord Kyllachy.

His nephew was Robert Louis Stevenson.

Lighthouses designed by David Stevenson

 Whalsay Skerries (1854)
 Out Skerries (1854)
 Muckle Flugga (1854)
 Davaar (1854)
 Ushenish (1857)
 South Rona (1857)
 Kyleakin (1857)
 Ornsay (1857)
 Sound of Mull (1857)
 Cantick Head (1858)
 Bressay (1858)
 Ruvaal (1859)
 Corran Point (1860)
 Fladda (1860)
 McArthur's Head (1861)
 St Abb's Head (1862)
 Butt of Lewis (1862)
 Holborn Head (1862)
 Monach Islands (1864)
 Skervuile (1865)
 Auskerry (1866)
 Lochindaal (1869)
 Scurdie Ness (1870)
Stoer Head (1870)
 Dubh Artach (1872)
 Turnberry (1873)
 Chicken Rock (1875)
 Lindisfarne (1877, 1880)

See also
Richard Henry Brunton

References

External links
Life of Robert Stevenson: Civil Engineer (1878), by David Stevenson. From Internet Archive.

Lighthouse builders
Scottish civil engineers
Engineers from Edinburgh
People educated at the Royal High School, Edinburgh
Alumni of the University of Edinburgh
Fellows of the Royal Society of Edinburgh
1815 births
1886 deaths
Stevenson family (Scotland)